Mark, Marc or Marcus Joseph may refer to:

Mark Joseph (singer) (born 1982), English musician
Mark Joseph (author), American novelist
Mark Joseph (producer) (born 1968), American multimedia producer and author
Mark Joseph (actor), Filipino actor
Mark Joseph (footballer) (born 1965), Welsh footballer
Marc Joseph (born 1976), English and Antiguan footballer
Marc Bamuthi Joseph (born 1975), American poet
Marcus Joseph (born 1991), of the Trinidad and Tobago national football team

See also